George Westinghouse Career and Technical Education High School is a vocational high school in Downtown Brooklyn, New York, United States.  It is located at 105 Tech Place, south of Tillary Street and east of Jay Street.
It is named after the electrical pioneer George Westinghouse Jr.

The school was one of a number of New York City public schools that dropped Native American-themed sports team names.

Notable alumni
 Joe Pignatano, MLB catcher
 Larry McNeill, NBA player
 Roosevelt Chapman, basketball player and University of Dayton standout
 Michael K. Williams, actor
 Jay-Z, real name Shawn Carter, hip-hop artist and entrepreneur
 Busta Rhymes, real name Trevor Smith, Jr., hip-hop artist and actor
 The Notorious B.I.G., real name Christopher Wallace, hip-hop artist 
 Oliver "Power" Grant, entrepreneur, producer, actor and close Wu-Tang Clan associate
 Ed Smith, APF Black Video Game and Personal Computer designer during the 1970s
 Theophilus London, rapper and singer

References

External links
Site on school at Education.com 
Official NYC Department of Education site

Public high schools in Brooklyn